Gerogery railway station is a heritage-listed closed and disused railway station on the Main South railway line in New South Wales, Australia. The station is located in the small village of Gerogery on the Olympic Highway in the Greater Hume Shire. It opened in 1880 and consists of a signal box (now demolished) and weatherboard station building. The station is located at a passing loop and is in a significant state of disrepair.

References

External links

Disused regional railway stations in New South Wales
New South Wales State Heritage Register
Railway stations in Australia opened in 1880
Greater Hume Shire
Main Southern railway line, New South Wales